is a Japanese animator and character designer, often noted for his work in the 1980s with noted anime studio Sunrise.

Works
 Farewell to Space Battleship Yamato (1978) - Chief Animation Director
 Space Runaway Ideon (1980) - Character Designer, Animation Director
 Combat Mecha Xabungle (1982) - Character Designer
 Aura Battler Dunbine (1983) - Original creator, Character Design, Animation Director (ep. 1), Production Supervision
 Super Dimension Cavalry Southern Cross (1984) - Character Designer
 Heavy Metal L-Gaim (1984) - Animation Director
 Odin: Photon Sailer Starlight (1985) - Character Design
 Greed (1985) - Original Creator, Director, Character Design, Screenplay, Storyboard, Animation Director
 Cool Cool Bye (1986) - Director, Script, Original story, Character Design, Animation Director
 Legend of the Galactic Heroes (1988-1997) - Storyboard (eps 7, 20), Animation Director (ep 7), Guest Character Design (eps 6–7)
 Tekkaman Blade (1992) - Character Design (as TOIIIO), Animation Coordination
 Casshan: Robot Hunter (1993) - Character Designer
 Strahl (1993) - Character Design
 4th Super Robot Wars (1995) - Main Character Designer
 Space Battleship Yamato: Resurrection (2009) - Character Design, Animation Director
 Folktales from Japan (2012-2013) - Storyboard (eps 33a, 60a, 68c), Episode Director (eps 33a, 60a, 68c), Character Design (eps 33a, 60a, 68c), Art (eps 33a, 60a), Animation Director (eps 33a, 60a, 68c), Background Art (eps 33a, 60a), Color setting (ep 60a), Finish Animation (ep 60a), In-Between Animation (eps 60a, 68c), Key Animation (eps 33a, 60a, 68c)
 Omae wa Mada Gunma o Shiranai (2018) - Character Design, Chief Animation Director, Key Animation (eps. 1–2)

References

External links 
 Tomonori Kogawa anime at Media Arts Database 

Sunrise (company) people
1950 births
Living people
Japanese animators
Anime character designers
People from Hokkaido